Hallucinations of a Deranged Mind   is a 1978 Brazilian horror film directed by José Mojica Marins. Marins is also known by his alter ego Zé do Caixão (in English, Coffin Joe). The film features Coffin Joe as the central character, although it is not part of the "Coffin Joe trilogy".

Plot
The story is built around a montage of scenes that were omitted or censored from four of Marins' earlier films: Awakening of the Beast, This Night I'll Possess Your Corpse, The Bloody Exorcism of Coffin Joe and The Strange World of Coffin Joe. Marins filmed approximately 35 minutes of new scenes, also adding the characters to the plot. Marins portrays himself as well as the character of Coffin Joe in the film.

The story is built around Dr. Hamílton, a psychiatrist who is terrorized by nightmares in which Coffin Joe tries to steal his wife. His colleagues decide to seek medical help with the assistance of filmmaker Jose Mojica Marins (appearing as himself), who tries to reassure Dr. Hamílton that Coffin Joe is merely a creation of his mind.

Cast
José Mojica Marins as himself/Coffin Joe
Jorge Peres as Dr. Hamilton
Magna Miller as Tânia, wife of Dr. Hamilton
Jayme Cortez
Lírio Bertelli
Anadir Goi
João da Cruz
Alexa Brandwira
Walter Setembro
Natalina Barbosa

References

External links 
Official film site 

Delírios de um Anormal on Portal Brasileiro de Cinema 

1978 films
1978 horror films
Brazilian horror films
Films directed by José Mojica Marins
1970s Portuguese-language films